West Virginia Public Broadcasting (WVPB) is the public television and radio state network serving the U.S. state of West Virginia. It is owned by the West Virginia Public Broadcasting Authority, an agency of the state government that holds the licenses for all Public Broadcasting Service (PBS) and National Public Radio (NPR) member stations licensed in West Virginia. It is headquartered in Charleston with studios in Morgantown and Beckley.

On January 1, 2015, West Virginia PBS and West Virginia Public Radio merged their brands, branding exclusively as "West Virginia Public Broadcasting" across radio and television.

Television
The first public television station in West Virginia signed on July 14, 1969 under the callsign WMUL-TV, broadcasting from Marshall University in Huntington. In 1981, WMUL-TV changed its call letters to WPBY-TV; two years later, the public station at West Virginia University in Morgantown, WWVU-TV, was renamed WNPB-TV. WPBY-TV and WNPB-TV received their new call letters to underline that the operations were managed by the state educational broadcasting authority, and not the university system. In 1992, the state completed a microwave link that permitted it to convert WNPB and the state's third PBS station, WSWP-TV in Grandview to become repeaters of WPBY-TV in Huntington and form a state network. On January 5, 2015, WPBY-TV changed its call letters to WVPB-TV as part of an effort to unify all of West Virginia Public Broadcasting's services under a single brand; the television network had previously been branded as "West Virginia PBS," a name that was phased out starting on January 1, 2015.

The state network has a total of five low-powered repeaters serving other areas out of the range of the three full-powered stations, most notably Wheeling and Parkersburg. Three directly repeat WNPB, one repeats WVPB and one repeats WSWP.

In the past the network showed some Marshall University and West Virginia University sports content, but has abandoned this practice due to Conference USA/Big 12 exclusivity agreements with commercial and cable outlets.

The current local content consists of a daily recap of the state legislative session, shows produced by the West Virginia University medical school, and student produced news from campus weekly products from Marshall University and West Virginia State University. It also broadcasts original documentaries on West Virginia history and culture, as well as live musical performances of Mountain Stage and the West Virginia Music Hall of Fame.

The combined footprint of WVPB's television network covers almost all of West Virginia, as well as portions of Kentucky, Maryland, Ohio, Pennsylvania and Virginia. It is carried on the basic tier of all cable systems in West Virginia.

TV stations

Notes:

Translators

W34FE-D (previously W51EG-D) has been silent since February 2020, when T-Mobile began using its spectrum for wireless services; it relocated to channel 34 effective October 6, 2022.

On June 1, 2016, West Virginia Public Broadcasting announced a plan to shut down five of its translators — W07DN-D, W08EE-D, W09CT-D, W30CO-D, and W41AO — due to state budget cuts and changes in viewing habits. All five translators were originally planned to be taken silent for a year in order to determine a long-term plan. Operations on W08EE-D (Martinsburg) and W30CO-D (Wheeling) resumed on August 10, 2016, while the licenses for W07DN-D (Wardensville), W09CT-D (Mathias), and W41AO (Hampshire) were surrendered to the FCC for cancellation on May 26, 2017.

Digital television

Digital channels
All digital signals are multiplexed:

Analog-to-digital conversion
West Virginia Public Broadcasting's stations shut down their analog signals on June 12, 2009, the official date in which full-power television stations in the United States transitioned from analog to digital broadcasts under federal mandate. The station's digital channel allocations post-transition are as follows:
 WPBY-TV shut down its analog signal, over UHF channel 33; the station's digital signal remained on its pre-transition UHF channel 34. Through the use of PSIP, digital television receivers display the station's virtual channel as its former UHF analog channel 33.
 WSWP-TV shut down its analog signal, over VHF channel 9; the station's digital signal relocated from its pre-transition UHF channel 53, which was among the high band UHF channels (52-69) that were removed from broadcasting use as a result of the transition, to VHF channel 10. Through the use of PSIP, digital television receivers display the station's virtual channel as its former VHF analog channel 9.
 WNPB-TV shut down its analog signal, over UHF channel 24; the station's digital signal remained on its pre-transition UHF channel 33. Through the use of PSIP, digital television receivers display the station's virtual channel as its former UHF analog channel 24.

Radio

WVPB's state radio network includes eleven full-powered stations and seven low-powered translators, all on the FM band. The state network carries programs from NPR, PRI and other distributors, as well as classical and folk music. WVPB produces original weekly programs, including EclecTopia, A Change of Tune, Inside Appalachia and Sidetracks, plus the nationally distributed Mountain Stage. The network was known as "West Virginia Public Radio" until WVPB's 2015 transition to a single brand.

FM stations

Notes:

Translators
In addition to five low-powered, separate-frequency translators, two low-powered boosters also extend coverage. Boosters are licensed on the same frequency as the parent station but at a different location. They are given the same callsign as the parent station with a number added to differentiate the transmitter site.

Website and online services
West Virginia Public Broadcasting maintains a website with West Virginia news and free access to original video and audio productions. It also provides its videos through its YouTube page.

WVPB also operates a free website with educational videos and games for teachers, parents and students called West Virginia LearningMedia, part of PBS LearningMedia.

References

External links
 West Virginia Public Broadcasting Online

Television stations in West Virginia
PBS member networks
Huntington, West Virginia
Marshall University
NPR member networks
Television channels and stations established in 1969
1969 establishments in West Virginia